The European Journal of Political Theory is a quarterly peer-reviewed academic journal that covers the field of political theory and philosophy. The editors-in-chief are Enzo Rossi (University of Amsterdam) and Robin Douglass (King's College London). It was established 2002 and is published by SAGE Publications.

Abstracting and indexing 
The journal is abstracted and indexed in Current Contents/Social and Behavioral Sciences, Scopus, and Worldwide Political Science Abstracts.

External links 
 

SAGE Publishing academic journals
English-language journals
Political philosophy journals
Publications established in 2002
2002 establishments in the United Kingdom